Joe the Red (Italian: Joe il rosso) is a 1936 Italian comedy crime film directed by Raffaello Matarazzo and starring Armando Falconi, Luisa Garella and Ada Dondini.

The film's sets were designed by the art director Gastone Medin.

Cast
 Armando Falconi as Joe Mark / Joe il Rosso 
 Luisa Garella as Marta Sandelle-Lafitte 
 Ada Dondini as Duchess Sofia di Sandelle-Lafitte 
 Barbara Monis as Annamaria 
 Aristide Baghetti as Gontrano Sandelle.Lafitte 
 María Denis as Marietta Clavel 
 Luigi Pavese as Stefano Sandelle-Lafitte 
 Angelo Bizzari as Giuliano lo spagnolo 
 Maria Dominiani as Ziska 
 Cesare Zoppetti as Ruggero d'Arment 
 Emilio Petacci as The detective 
 Remo Lotti as Germano il maggiordomo 
 Ugo Sasso as Un gangster

References

Bibliography 
 Aprà, Adriano. The Fabulous Thirties: Italian Cinema 1929-1944. Electa International, 1979.

External links 
 

1936 films
Italian crime comedy films
Italian black-and-white films
1930s crime comedy films
1930s Italian-language films
Films directed by Raffaello Matarazzo
1936 comedy films
1930s Italian films